Ulka Gupta (born 12 April 1997) is an Indian actress who predominantly works in Hindi and Telugu films and television. She is popularly known as Manu, as she played the role of Manu (the young Rani Lakshmibai) in the Zee TV soap Jhansi Ki Rani until the leap; later she made a re-entry in the same show as Kaali. Her debut film was the Tollywood film Andhra Pori, in which she plays the lead character, Prashanti. Gupta also appeared in the 2015 Telugu film Rudhramadevi.

Personal life
Ulka Gupta was born on 12 April 1997 in Saharsa, Bihar. Her family is native to the area. She was brought up in Mumbai. Her father Gagan and her younger sister Goya are also actors. She studied at Rustomjee International School, Dahisar, Mumbai.

Career
Gupta first faced the camera in Resham Dankh, and then appeared in Saat Phere, as Savri, Saloni's daughter. She is best known for her versatile performance as Manu in Jhansi Ki Rani. For making the serial very lively, she worked hard and took horse riding and sword fighting training for two months. She also learned Sanskrit to deliver shlokas. She played Ami in Khelti Hai Zindagi Aankh Micholi on Zee TV. She worked in the Telugu film Andhra Pori, produced by Ramesh Prasad, opposite Akash Puri, the son of Puri Jagannadh. It was released in June 2015.

Filmography

Films

Television

Awards

2010

 Indian Telly Awards - Most Popular Child Artist in Jhansi Ki Rani
 Zee Gold Awards - Best Performer of the Year in Jhansi Ki Rani
 ITA Awards - Jhansi Ki Rani
 Indian Telly Awards - Best Actress in Jhansi Ki Rani

See also 

 List of Indian film actresses
 List of Indian television actresses

References

External links

 
 

Indian television actresses
Actresses from Bihar
Actresses from Mumbai
Living people
1997 births
Actresses in Hindi television
Actresses in Hindi cinema
21st-century Indian actresses
People from Saharsa district
Actresses in Telugu cinema